Henry Harrison Sprague (August 1, 1841 – July 28, 1920) was a Massachusetts lawyer and politician who served as a member of the Boston, Massachusetts Common Council, in the Massachusetts House of Representatives, and as a member, and President of, the Massachusetts Senate.

He died at his home in Boston on July 28, 1920, and was buried at Mount Auburn Cemetery.

See also
 109th Massachusetts General Court (1888)
 111th Massachusetts General Court (1890)

References

External links
 

1841 births
People from Athol, Massachusetts
Politicians from Boston
Harvard University alumni
Massachusetts lawyers
Boston City Council members
Members of the Massachusetts House of Representatives
Massachusetts state senators
Presidents of the Massachusetts Senate
1920 deaths
Lawyers from Boston
19th-century American lawyers
Burials at Mount Auburn Cemetery